"I'm Alright" is a song written and performed by American rock musician Kenny Loggins. It was used as the theme music for the 1980 comedy film Caddyshack. The track was released as a single in 1980 and then reached the top 10 of the U.S. singles chart. Eddie Money makes a guest appearance in the song's background chorus. The song is also one of the most frequent choices in Loggins' concert, and included in all three of his official concert material releases – Kenny Loggins Alive, Live from Grand Canyon, and Outside: From the Redwoods.

Track listing
7" Vinyl
"I'm Alright" (Loggins) – 3:25
"Lead the Way" (Loggins, Eva Ein Loggins) – 4:27

Chart performance

Personnel
Kenny Loggins – lead vocals, guitar
Mike Hamilton – guitar, backing vocals
George Hawkins – bass, backing vocals
Brian Mann – keyboards, backing vocals
Tris Imboden – drums, backing vocals
Mark Wittenberg – guitar
Eddie Money – backing vocals, lead vocals on the bridge

References 

1980 singles
Kenny Loggins songs
Songs written for films
Songs written by Kenny Loggins
Columbia Records singles
1980 songs
Eddie Money songs